Tallé w Chettaha,  is a village in Akkar Governorate, Lebanon and it is one of the few remaining Maronite Christian-inhabited villages of Akkar.   It is situated 125 km north of the capital Beirut and it is located at approximately 600 metres from sea level. Saint George is the saint of the village, his feast day is April 23 of each year At that time, the people of Tallé w Chittaha gather for a mass.

Government 

The elected council of Tallé w Chettaha is composed of: Roni El Hage, Aziz Barbar, Antoine Abou Halloun, Joseph Kadissi, Rima Bechara, Raline El Hage, Georges El Hage, Toni Kadissi, and Jacques Abou Hanna.

Families of the village 

 Abou Halloun
 Abou Hanna
 Aouad
 Barbar
 Bechara
 El Hage
 Gerges
 Habib
 Ishac
 Jbeily
 Kaddissy
 Kalkach
 Khalil
 Sassine
 Tannous
 Wehbe
 Zeinoun

Climate

References

External links
 Tallé w Chettaha,  Localiban 

Populated places in Akkar District
Maronite Christian communities in Lebanon